San Marino competed at the 2008 Summer Olympics in Beijing, People's Republic of China.

Athletics

Men

Shooting 

Women

Swimming 

Men

Women

External links
San Marino NOC

Nations at the 2008 Summer Olympics
2008
Olympics